The Arnolds Field rubbish dump in Launders Lane in Rainham, London has been the location of a large number of fires since around 2013, exposing local residents to toxic fumes.

The site was a gravel pit in the 1960s, and subsequently used for landfill from 1967 to 1971. Planning permission was granted in 2000 to convert the area to community woodland. Since that time, a large amount of waste has been deposited without authorisation. The London Fire Brigade have said that the site periodically reignites due to the build-up of rubbish on the site, which had been dumped "in excess of five metres" above council-approved levels. Between 2018 and 2022 the Fire Brigade had been called out to the site more than 70 times.

Efforts have been by Havering Council to deal with the problem, with the assistance of the London Fire Brigade and Environment Agency. Attempts to remedy the problem have been complicated by multiple issues, including decades of illegal dumping of unknown materials and previous use of the site as a cannabis farm and weapons store.

A 2012 site study found elevated levels of lead and benzo(a)pyrene in the soil.
In 2023, Imperial College's Environmental Research Group was collecting data regarding the pollution caused by the fires.

References

External links 
 Breezometer pollution map of the area around Rainham

Fires in London
21st-century fires
Landfills in the United Kingdom